Pablo Jacob Seisdedos Duque (born 26 January 1988) is a Chilean road and track cyclist. He competed at the 2010, 2011 and 2012 UCI Track Cycling World Championships.

Major results

Road
2009
 1st Stage 4 
2014
 3rd Time trial, National Road Championships

References

External links
 Profile at cyclingarchives.com

1988 births
Living people
Chilean track cyclists
Chilean male cyclists
Place of birth missing (living people)
Cyclists at the 2011 Pan American Games
Cyclists at the 2015 Pan American Games
Cyclists at the 2019 Pan American Games
Pan American Games medalists in cycling
Pan American Games silver medalists for Chile
Pan American Games bronze medalists for Chile
South American Games bronze medalists for Chile
South American Games medalists in cycling
Competitors at the 2010 South American Games
Medalists at the 2011 Pan American Games
Medalists at the 2019 Pan American Games
20th-century Chilean people
21st-century Chilean people